The Kei Island worm snake (Malayotyphlops kraalii) is a species of snake in the family Typhlopidae.

Etymology
The specific name, kraalii, is in honor of Captain P.F. Kraal of the Dutch military in the Moluccas, who assisted the Italian expedition on which the holotype was collected.

Geographic range
M. kraalii is found in the Kai Islands of Indonesia.

Reproduction
M. kraalii is oviparous.

References

Further reading
Boulenger GA (1893). Catalogue of the Snakes in the British Museum (Natural History). Volume I., Containing the Families Typhlopidæ ... London: Trustees of the British Museum (Natural History). (Taylor and Francis, printers). xiii + 448 pp. + Plates I-XXVIII. (Typhlops kraalii, p. 30).
Doria G (1874). "Enumerazione dei rettili raccolti dal Dott. O. Beccari in Amboina, alle Isole Aru ed alle Isole Kei durante gli anni 1872-73 [= Enumeration of the reptiles collected by Dr. O. Beccari on Ambon Island, in the Aru Islands and in the Kai Islands during the years 1872-1873]". Annali del Museo Civico di Storia Naturale di Genova 6: 325-357 + Plates XI-XII. (Typhlops kraalii, new species, p. 347 + Plate XII, figure f, 5 views). (in Italian).
Hedges SB, Marion AB, Lipp KM, Marin J, Vidal N (2014). "A taxonomic framework for typhlopid snakes from the Caribbean and other regions (Reptilia, Squamata)". Caribbean Herpetology (49): 1-61. (Malayotyphlops kraalii, new combination).

Malayotyphlops
Reptiles described in 1874